Khom is a rural locality (a village) in Tarnogskoye Rural Settlement, Tarnogsky District, Vologda Oblast, Russia. The population was 68 as of 2002. There are 3 streets.

Geography 
Khom is located 7 km northeast of Tarnogsky Gorodok (the district's administrative centre) by road. Sluda is the nearest rural locality.

References 

Rural localities in Tarnogsky District